is the 27th studio album by the Japanese singer-songwriter Miyuki Nakajima.

In November 1999, it was simultaneously released with another album Sun: Wings which has a similar concept. Both albums contain the songs written for the series of Yakai, which had been her conventional plays performed each December from 1989 to 1998.

Moon is Nakajima's least successful studio album in terms of sales, entering the Japanese charts for less than one month. It became the final album released by her long-term label Pony Canyon, because she moved to the newly founded semi-independent record label Yamaha Music Communications in the following year.

Track listing
All songs written and composed by Miyuki Nakajima, arranged by Ichizo Seo (except "Pain" arranged by David Campbell).
"" – 5:05
"" – 6:22
"Last Scene" – 6:25
"" – 4:16
"Smile, Smile" – 5:23
"Pain" – 8:04
"" – 4:54
"" – 4:16
"" – 5:18

Personnel
Kenny Aronoff – drums
Russ Kunkel – drums, cymbals
Hideo Yamaki – cymbals
M.B. Gordy – percussion
Lee Sklar – bass
Bob Glaub – bass
Neil Stubenhaus – bass
Reggie Hamilton – bass
Chiharu Mikuzuki – bass
Oscar Meza – bass
David Stone – bass
Michael Thompson – electric guitar
Chuei Yoshikawa – auto-harp
Yasuharu Nakanishi – keyboards
Elton Nagata – keyboards
Ichizo Seo – keyboards
Jon Gilutin – keyboards, acoustic piano, electric piano, synthesizer, Hammond organ, panpipe
Shingo Kobayashi – keyboards, programming
Keishi Urata – programming, drum-loop, percussion loop, sound effect
Seiichi Takubo – programming, drum-loop, percussion loop, sound effect
Manabu Ogasawara – programming, drum-loop
Yosuke Sugimoto – programming
Walter Fowler – trumpet
Brandon Fields – tenor saxophone
Stephen Kupka – baritone saxophone
Chris Bleth – oboe, English horn
Sheridon Stokes – flute
Geraldine Rotella – flute
Robert Becker – viola
Matt Funes – viola
Scott Haupert – viola
Denyse Buffum – viola
Matthew Funes – viola
Renia Koven – viola
David Stenske – viola
Karie Prescott – viola
Larry Corbett – cello
Stefanie Fife – cello
Daniel Smith – cello
Rudolph Stein – cello
Steve Richards – cello
Sid Page – violin (concertmaster)
Joel Derouin – violin (concertmaster)
Eve Butler – violin
Berj Garabedian – violin
Armen Garabedian – violin
Shari Zippert – violin
Gerrardo Hilera – violin
Mario De Leon – violin
Erza Kliger – violin
Susan Charman – violin
John Wittenberg – violin
Murray Adler – violin
Michele Richards – violin
Edmund Stein – violin
Robert Peterson – violin
Peter Kent – violin
Clayton Haslop – violin
Gary Kuo – violin
Ruth Bruegger – violin
Barbra Porter – violin
Virginia Frazier – violin
David Campbell – strings conducting
Suzie Katayama – strings conducting
Julia Waters – backing vocals
Maxine Waters – backing vocals
Oren Waters – backing vocals
Peggi Blu – backing vocals

Release history

Chart positions

References

Miyuki Nakajima albums
1999 albums